Hippolyte-Marie-Guillaume de Rosnyvinen, Comte de Piré, (Rennes, 31 March 1778 – Paris, 20 July 1850) was a French general who fought in the Napoleonic Wars.

His name is inscribed on the second column of the Northern Pillar of the Arc de Triomphe.

Notes

References

Further reading

1778 births
1850 deaths
Military personnel from Rennes
Barons of the First French Empire
French generals
Generals of the First French Empire
Grand Officiers of the Légion d'honneur
Knights of the Order of Saint Louis
Names inscribed under the Arc de Triomphe